Nutwood Place is a historic farm complex on the northern edge of Urbana, Ohio, United States. Today composed of the farmhouse, a round barn, and a small amount of former fields, the farm has been owned by some of Urbana's leading families.  Colonel William Ward, the founder of Urbana and the farm's original owner, built the farmhouse in 1815. At this time, he owned  of land north of the village of Urbana; there he established his farm under the name of "Nutwood Place," where he lived until his 1822 death.

Commercial hatter Absalom Jennings of New York City bought the farm in 1856, but he waited three years before taking up residence there. Here he remained for the rest of his life, breeding horses and cattle. Under his direction, the brick round barn was erected in 1861.

In 1976, Nutwood Place was added to the National Register of Historic Places because of its well-preserved historic architecture. It is one of eight places listed on the National Register in Urbana.

References

Houses completed in 1815
Buildings and structures in Champaign County, Ohio
Farms on the National Register of Historic Places in Ohio
National Register of Historic Places in Champaign County, Ohio
Urbana, Ohio